Christiaan Ravych (born 30 July 2002) is a Belgian professional footballer who plays as a defensive midfielder for Cercle Brugge.

Professional career
Ravych is a youth product of the academy of Club Brugge, and moved to the neighboring club Cercle Brugge in 2021. On 8 December 2021, he signed a semi-professional contract with Cercle. He made his professional debut with Cercle Brugge as a late substitute in a 1–0 Belgian First Division A win over Anderlecht on 30 July 2022.

International career
Ravych is a youth international for Belgium, having played up to the Belgium U17s.

References

External links
 
 Pro League profile
 ACFF Profile

2002 births
Living people
Belgian footballers
Belgium youth international footballers
Association football midfielders
Cercle Brugge K.S.V. players
Belgian Pro League players